Béla Zoltán (17 December 1901 – 1982) was a Hungarian rower. He competed in the men's coxed four event at the 1928 Summer Olympics.

References

1901 births
1982 deaths
Hungarian male rowers
Olympic rowers of Hungary
Rowers at the 1928 Summer Olympics
Place of birth missing